The name Fausto has been used for seven tropical cyclones in the Eastern Pacific Ocean.
 Hurricane Fausto (1984)
 Hurricane Fausto (1990)
 Hurricane Fausto (1996), made landfall on southern Baja California
 Hurricane Fausto (2002), regenerated into a tropical storm well north of the Hawaiian islands
 Hurricane Fausto (2008), ran parallel to the Mexican Rivera
 Tropical Storm Fausto (2014), never threatened land
 Tropical Storm Fausto (2020), remnants brought severe storms in California, killing one.

Pacific hurricane set index articles